In Action may refer to:
 In Action, a 1960 album by Little Willie John
 In Action, a 1962 album by The Chad Mitchell Trio
 In Action (Menudo album)
 In Action (Johnny Rivers album)
 In Action (EP), an EP by We Are Scientists
 Mary-Kate and Ashley in Action!, a 26-episode TV series about the Olsen twins